Mariano Chicho Frúmboli (born 21 September 1970 in Buenos Aires) is an Argentinian tango dancer. He is regarded as one of the founders of tango nuevo, and he is best known for his musicality and creativity while improvising.

Early life 
His father was a teacher of fine arts and studied guitar. In 1984 he was 13 and started studying music. He studied in the "David Lebon Music School" in Buenos Aires as a drum player, which he played for 14 years and studied theatre for 8 years before discovering tango.
From 1992 until 1998 he studied theater in Buenos Aires with Cristina Banegas.

Career 
He began dancing tango in 1993.

I'm going to tell you a story. I was into rock-and-roll; I had long hair and played the drums. I hated tango, I didn't like it one bit, I couldn't even listen to it. But when I went to take a class with Ricardo Barrios and Victoria Vieyra, I embraced my dance partner for the first time and I got goose bumps. I said, "there's something going on here..." and I never stopped. That magical moment was my beginning. On the other hand, a few years ago I went to the "La Trastienda" milonga organized by Horacio Godoy. I walked in and I saw you (Milena Plebs). I wanted to dance with you but second-guessed myself. I went back and forth until I asked you. I remember we were talking, then we embraced each other and in that moment I felt 40 years of tango. In the embrace, do you understand? We hadn't taken a single step! It was simply from the way in which you held me. For me that was the most powerful moment of the tanda. Then we danced for a long time. It was great, we did all sort of things, I enjoyed myself. But the moment of that embrace, like the one of my first class and some others, have marked me in regards to my relationship with the dance. I'm talking about the intimacy of the embrace. With very few people have I been able to feel the same way, much has been lost. My wish for the dance of tango, then, is that the shared intensity returns, in the soul. Not to stay in the surface, but to feel it inside. That the genre evolves from that intimacy. The essence of tango is in the embrace and the person you are dancing with.

Two years later he started dancing with Victoria Vieyra and then with Teté Rusconi. Victoria took him to Gustavo Naveira's and Fabián Salas's training group.

Between 1994 and 1998 he studied with the masters Ricardo Barrios and Victoria Vieyra, practicing and consolidating his style. He then followed other famous teachers, including: Luis Solanas and Cecilia Troncoso, Carla Marano, Tete and Maria, Alejandro Suaya and Elina Roldan, Graciela Gonzales and Patricia Lamberti, Julio Balmaceda and Valencia Batik. During this period he was noted for his performances with Victoria Vieyra, Eugenia Ramirez and Claudia Jacobsen. Following continued to study with Gustavo Naveira and Fabián Salas. In October 1998, along with Victoria Vieyra, Chicho arrived in Europe. He settled first in France and then in Belgium where he presented and taught tango nuevo.

He first partnered with a dancer named Laura. Shortly after, in 1999, he started performing with Lucía Mazer with whom he worked for the next 4 years. He has happened to call this period the most creative of his career.

After breaking up and ending his intense professional and personal relationship with Lucia he partnered with Eugenia Parrilla from 2003 until 2006. In an interview he called these years his most "artistic years".

Currently he tours and performs with Juana Sepúlveda, a partnership since 2007.

He performed live with numerous tango orchestras and even neotango groups such as Gotan Project, Tanghetto and Narcotango.  Since 2009 Chicho and Juana teach and perform at the annual Tango Element Festival in Baltimore, Maryland DC.

Selected filmography 
 Tango libre (2012)
 Fermín glorias del tango (2014)

Video clips 
Tango Ritual "" (2007)
Tango Arte "" (2003)
Tango Element 2013 " (2013)
Tango Element 2013 " (2013)
Tango Element 2012 " (2012)
Tango Element 2010 " (2010)
ARCOS - by Jelly Films " (2017)

See also
 List of dancers

References

Tangauta interview - One to one with Milena Plebs "" (2009)

Argentine Tango - Dance Research Centre "" (2008)

External links / sources 
 Video with Lucía Mazer
 Video with Eugenia Parilla on June 6th, 2006
 Video with Juana Sepúlveda
 Tango Libre: Venice Review
 Video at Tango Element

Notes and references 
^ One on One with Milena Plebs and Chicho Frumboli Interview, El Tangauta 182, Dec 2009

1970 births
Living people
People from Buenos Aires
Argentine male dancers
Tango dancers